The 2017 Tampa Bay Rowdies season was the club's eighth season of existence, and their first in the United Soccer League. Including the previous Tampa Bay Rowdies, this was the 24th season of a franchise in the Tampa Bay metro area with the Rowdies moniker. Including the now-defunct Tampa Bay Mutiny, this was the 30th season of professional soccer in the Tampa Bay region.

Club

Roster

Technical staff

  Stuart Campbell – Head coach
  Raoul Voss – Assistant coach
  Stuart Dobson – Goalkeeper coach
  Cheyne Roberts – Rowdies 2 head coach
  Jason Riley – Strength and conditioning coach
  Dr. Koco Eaton – Team physician/orthopedic surgeon
  Dr. Sanjay Menon – Team physician/orthopedic surgeon
  Dr. Christopher Salud – Team physician

Front office
  Bill Edwards – Chairman, chief executive officer and governor
  Andrew Nestor – Director
  David Laxer – Director
  Lee Cohen – Vice president and chief operating officer

Competitions

Preseason 
The Rowdies began their preseason by co-hosting and participating in the 2017 Florida Cup. Tampa Bay also hosted Major League Soccer teams in the Suncoast Invitational for the second year in a row.

USL 

The Rowdies completed the USL regular season in third place on the Eastern Conference table with 53 points. This was one point behind the second place, Charleston Battery, and nine behind table-toppers, Louisville City FC. Tampa Bay finished the season strongly, going unbeaten in their final seven matches, and losing only two of their final fifteen. Their top-four finish also guaranteed that they would host at least one playoff match.

USL Eastern Conference table

Results summary

Matches

USL Cup playoffs 

The Rowdies clinched their spot in the single elimination 2017 USL playoffs on October 4, with a 3–2 victory over New York Red Bulls II.

U.S. Open Cup

Honors

Individual honors
USL All-League
 Marcel Schäfer (1st team)

Broadcast partners
Local Hearst Television channel, WMOR-TV, announced on March 9, 2017 that they would be the Tampa Bay Rowdies' exclusive broadcast partners for the upcoming United Soccer League season. All USL home games will be broadcast live and in primetime on channel 32.2, thisTV Tampa Bay.

References 

Tampa Bay Rowdies
Tampa Bay Rowdies (2010–) seasons
Tampa Bay Rowdies
Tampa Bay Rowdies
Sports in St. Petersburg, Florida